Geoff Mandy (28 December 1919 – 28 May 1994) was a South African diver. He competed in the men's 10 metre platform event at the 1948 Summer Olympics.

References

External links
 

1919 births
1994 deaths
South African male divers
Olympic divers of South Africa
Divers at the 1948 Summer Olympics
People from Uitenhage
Sportspeople from the Eastern Cape
20th-century South African people